The marquee event of alpine skiing was held on Sunday, February 10, at the  Snowbasin ski area, east of Ogden under clear skies.

The average gradient on the Grizzly Downhill was 30.87% (17.98°), exceeding the classic layouts of Kitzbühel (860 m vertical / 3312 m length = 25.97%, 15.05°) and Wengen (1025 m vertical / 4455 m length = 23.01%, 13.30°).

The top five finishers completed the course in less than a hundred seconds, making it the quickest descending Olympic downhill. The average speed of the medalists for the entire course exceeded , rating it among the fastest courses in international competition.

Pre-race favorite Stephan Eberharter of Austria took the bronze medal, bested by compatriot Fritz Strobl and all-arounder Lasse Kjus of Norway.

Results
The race was started at 10:00 local time, (UTC −7).

References

External links
Official Olympic Report
FIS results

Downhill